The Newly Discovered Casebook of Sherlock Holmes was a BBC Radio 2 comedy series written by Tony Hare.  It starred Roy Hudd, Chris Emmett, Jeffrey Holland, and June Whitfield, and was broadcast between 16 January 1999, to 20 February 1999.  It has since been re-broadcast on BBC Radio 4 Extra (formerly called BBC Radio 7).

The burlesque series was a comic pastiche of Sir Arthur Conan Doyle's fictional detective Sherlock Holmes.  The series was recorded in front of a live audience and each 30 minute episode was broadcast on BBC Radio 2 at 1pm, making some of the rude, and occasionally crude, jokes rather risqué for the time of day.

Hudd, Emmett, and Whitfield had all worked together on the very long-running radio series The News Huddlines.  Holland is a familiar voice in British comedy series, probably best known for his role as Spike Dixon, the camp comic at Maplin's holiday camp, Crimpton-on-Sea, in the BBC sitcom Hi-de-Hi!

Hudd later appeared alongside Clive Merrison as Holmes, and Andrew Sachs as Doctor Watson in an original radio play in the series The Further Adventures of Sherlock Holmes in 2002.

Episode guide

Cast
 Roy Hudd as Sherlock Holmes
 Chris Emmett as Dr. Watson
 June Whitfield as Mrs. Hudson and other females
 Geoffrey Whitehead as Professor Moriarty and other males
 Jeffrey Holland as Inspector Lestrade and other males

References
epguides.com

BBC Radio comedy programmes
Detective radio shows
1999 radio programme debuts
1999 radio programme endings
Sherlock Holmes pastiches